Cuper's Gardens were 17–18th century pleasure gardens (or tea gardens) on the south side of the River Thames in Lambeth, London. The gardens looked over to Somerset House near Waterloo Bridge, and were centered on what is now the north end of Waterloo Road.

In 1643, Thomas Howard, 21st Earl of Arundel bought three acres of land which he leased to his gardener Abraham Boydell Cuper.
The gardens opened in the 1680s and were named after the original proprietor. They were also known as Cupid's Gardens. In 1686, seven acres of adjoining land was bought from the Archbishop of Canterbury, William Sancroft, and added to the gardens. A long landing stage in the river known as Cuper's Bridge acted as a popular entrance for the gardens.

In 1736, an orchestra was included among the attractions. It also became known for its firework displays. However, it lost its license in 1753 due to the loose morals of its visitors. It remained open as an unlicensed tea garden before finally closing in 1760.

See also
 Vauxhall Gardens

References

External links
 Vauxhall Society information
 Ideal Homes information
 Information from the National Theatre

Former parks and open spaces of London
Gardens in London
Entertainment in London
History of the London Borough of Lambeth
Pleasure gardens in England
1686 establishments in England
1753 disestablishments